Benjamin Aribisala (born 15 August 1972) is a Nigerian academic. He is a  professor of Computer Science 
and the current Vice-Chancellor of Oduduwa University since January 2021.

Biography 
He was born in Ikoyi, Ikole local government area, on 15 August 1972. He had his primary and secondary school education in Ikole Ekiti. For University education, he attended Ekiti State University where he obtained a bachelor's degree in Mathematics in 1994. He obtained a master's degree in Computer Science from Federal University of Technology, Akure in 1999. He obtained a PhD degree in Computer Science from the University of Birmingham, UK in 2006.

Awards and recognitions 
 He is a Fulbright Scholar in the University of Chicago.
 He won the Young Investigators award, by the Society for Brain Mapping and Therapeutics, Los Angeles, USA in 2015
 He won the IBM faculty award in 2014. and the British Council Researchers Link award in 2014

References

External links
 Professor Benjamin Aribisala on ResearchGate
 Professor Benjamin Aribisala on Google Scholar

Living people
1972 births
Yoruba academics